Maud Julia Augusta Russell (7 November 189127 May 1982) was a British socialite and art patron, who aided Jewish relatives in their escape from Nazi Germany during the 1930s.

Family 
The daughter of Maria and Paul Nelke, German Jewish immigrants, Maud grew up in London in the late 1800s and early 1900s.  In 1917, she married Gilbert Byng Alwyne Russell, a lieutenant in the Grenadier Guards. Maud's father, Paul Nelke, later helped Gilbert create the merchant banking firm Cull & Company. They had two sons; Martin Basil Paul Russell, eccentric banker, collector and a patron of Sri Lankan Cubism (1918-2003) and Raymond Anthony Russell. When Gilbert died in 1942 she wrote in her diary: "The main, the fullest, the richest and the most feeling part of life ended with him"

War diaries 
Maud was an avid reader and maintained a beautifully written diary throughout her life. Her diaries, recently uncovered and published, provide a rare record of the development of the war from Maud's perspective.

"She was unfortunate enough to live through both World Wars, suffering from anti-German sentiment during the Great War and helping her Jewish relations to escape Germany in the 1930s. From 1943-1945 she worked on secret propaganda activities at the Admiralty"

Art and architecture 
Maud remains one of the foremost English collectors of modern French art, and enjoyed a friendship with artists such as Boris Anrep of whom she was patron and eventually executrix of his will. Maud was one of the patrons for Boris Anrep's Modern Virtues, a collection of colourful mosaics which decorate the imposing staircase built by Sir John Taylor in 1887 for the entrance hall of the National Gallery, her name and portrait are expressed as the personification of Folly. Rex Whistler was another, who painted the namesake Whistler Drawing Room at Mottisfont in his famous trompe-l'œil style. She also shared a particularly close relationship with Ian Fleming, to whom she notably gave a gunmetal-finished, gold cigarette case which is thought to have been the inspiration for Red Grant's "oval gold cigarette case" in From Russia with Love. Fleming had also worked at Cull & Company.

Maud and Gilbert bought Mottisfont Abbey in 1934, and remodelled it from a building in ruin to a modern estate with the help of her artist friends. In 1957, she gifted the house and grounds to the National Trust but continued to live at Mottisfont until 1972. It was nominated a Grade I listed building in 1957, with the 1938-9 Rex Whistler drawing room a named feature of the listing.

Portraits 
 c.1914 Miss Maude Nelke (Oil on canvas). Sir William Nicholson (English, 1872-1949). Ferens Art Gallery
Date Unknown (pencil) John Singer Sargent 
Date Unknown, Maud as a young woman (Oil on canvas). Ambrose McEvoy. Private Collection 
Early 1930s, (Photograph) Cecil Beaton for Vogue Magazine
 c. 1934-35 Mrs Gilbert Russell, Sitting in Bed (Oil on canvas). Boris Anrep (Russian, 1883-1969). V&A Museum
1937, (Charcoal drawing) Henri Matisse (French, 1869-54)  
 1946 Maud Russell Angel of Mottisfont (Mosaic)  Boris Anrep (Russian, 1883-1969). Mottisfont Abbey
 1952 Folly,  (Mosaic) Boris Anrep (Russian, 1883-1969) National Gallery.
 Date Unknown Maud Russell (Drawing) Derek Hill (British, 1916-2000) Mottisfont, Hampshire (Accredited Museum)

References

Bibliography
Russell, Maud (1891-1982) A constant heart: The war diaries of Maud Russell, 1938-1945 (2017) Edited by Emily Russell ISBN 

1891 births
1982 deaths
British socialites
British patrons of the arts
British people of German-Jewish descent
20th-century British philanthropists